Aşağı Kürdmahmudlu (also, Aşağı Kürmahmudlu and Ashagy Kyurdmakhmudlu) is a village and municipality in the Fuzuli District of Azerbaijan.

References 

Populated places in Fuzuli District